The UEFA European Under-18 Championship 1993 Final Tournament was held in England.

Teams

The following teams qualified for the tournament:

 
  (host)

Group stage

Group A

Group B

Third place match

Final

See also
 1993 UEFA European Under-18 Championship qualifying

References

External links
Results by RSSSF

UEFA European Under-19 Championship
1993
Under-18
Under-18
July 1993 sports events in the United Kingdom
1993 in youth association football